Surp Nerses Shnorhali Cathedral is an Armenian Apostolic church in the neighbourhood of Bella Vista, Montevideo, Uruguay.

This temple, dedicated to the Catholicos saint Nerses Shnorhali, is the prelacy of the Uruguayan Diocese of the Armenian Holy Apostolic Church. Its current head is Archbishop Hakob Glnjian.

The church is part of a bigger ensemble of buildings that house Armenian-Uruguayan institutions. There is a memorial to the Armenian genocide, with a sculpture by Nerses Ounanian.

See also
 List of cathedrals in Uruguay
 Cathedral of Our Lady of Bzommar
 Armenians in Uruguay

References

External links
 Pictures of the Armenian Church

Church buildings in Montevideo
Armenian Apostolic cathedrals in Uruguay